The 1934 World Chess Championship was played between challenger Efim Bogoljubov and titleholder Alexander Alekhine, marking a rematch of the previous Championship in 1929. The match was held in various cities and towns in Germany from April 1 to June 14, with Alekhine retaining his title.

Results

The first player to win six games and score more than 15 points would be champion.

Alekhine retained the Championship.

External links
1934 World Chess Championship at the Internet Archive record of Graeme Cree's Chess Pages

Notes

1934
1934 in chess
1934 in German sport